Burgerregt is a town in Capricorn District Municipality in the Limpopo province of South Africa.

References

Populated places in the Blouberg Local Municipality